Domingo Traggia (1744–1816) was a Spanish military man, academic, historian and writer. He is the author of many works on various subjects from military engineering to poetry. He was the political governor of Cervera del Río Alhama in 1810.

Spanish male writers
People of the Peninsular War
People from Zaragoza
1744 births
1816 deaths